Clarence Joseph O'Connor (13 October 1909 – 21 April 1969) was an  Australian rules footballer who played with South Melbourne in the Victorian Football League (VFL).

References

External links

1909 births
1969 deaths
Australian rules footballers from Victoria (Australia)
Sydney Swans players